Thomas Lothian Johnston FRSE (9 March 1927 in Whitburn, West Lothian – 2009 in Edinburgh) was a Scottish economist. He was professor of Economics at Heriot-Watt University in 1966–1976. He was the 
President of the Royal Society of Edinburgh in 1993–1996. In 1985 Johnston was elected a Foreign Member of the Royal Swedish Academy of Engineering Sciences.

Johnston was the Principal of Heriot-Watt University from 1981 to 1988 and received an Honorary Doctorate from the University in 1989

References 

Frost's Scottish Who's Who
Obituaries - Scotsman.com

Scottish economists
Academics of Heriot-Watt University
Presidents of the Royal Society of Edinburgh
Members of the Royal Swedish Academy of Engineering Sciences
1927 births
2009 deaths